"The Heart of the Serpent" (originally in) is a 1958 science fiction short story by the Soviet writer and paleontologist Ivan Yefremov.

The crew of a spaceship encounters an alien ship in deep space. Speculation ensues about whether the other crew might be hostile. Comparisons are made to American SF writer Murray Leinster's story "First Contact", in which an elaborate protocol is developed to prevent the aliens from following the Terrans home and destroying them, or vice versa. The premise of Leinster's story is debunked, in part by pointing out that in order for a planet's civilization to become space-faring, they would need to be at peace among themselves and presumably have organized themselves into a planet-wide classless communist society, a point Yefremov had made earlier in his novel Andromeda. Thus the aliens must necessarily be peaceful.

This story takes place within the rubric of Yefremov's Great Circle, a confederation of galactic civilizations that communicate between each other, which also appears in the Andromeda  novel.

Influences 

The Hungarian space rock band Solaris has a track named after the story on their album 1990.

Bibliography 

 The Heart of the Serpent compilation of the Soviet SF translated by Roza Prokofieva. Moscow: Foreign Languages Publishing House, 1961, 267 pp.
 More Soviet Science Fiction. New York: Collier Books, 1962, 190 pp.  
 The Heart of the Serpent. NL: Fredonia Books, 4 September 2002, 272 pp. .
 A kígyó szíve (transl. Imre Makai), in: Galaktika, 2: 73-109. Budapest: Móra, 1972.

External links
  Cor Serpentis

Short stories by Ivan Yefremov
1958 short stories
Science fiction short stories